Sant Fruitós de Bages is a municipality in the comarca of Bages in Catalonia, Spain.  The monastery of Sant Benet de Bages is situated here.

The historical centre of the town maintains its medieval character, with houses around the church forming what is called a "sagrera".

References

External links
 Government data pages 

Municipalities in Bages